Tisha Walker (born  1975) is an American former competitive figure skater. She is the 1989 Prague Skate champion.

Personal life 
Walker was raised in Thousand Oaks, California. She has two daughters, Hannah and Nicole, born in the second half of the 1990s.

Career 
Walker was coached by Doug and Lauri Varvais at the Conejo Valley Ice Skating Center in Newbury Park, the Pickwick Ice Rink in Burbank, and the Ice Castle International Training Center in Lake Arrowhead, California.

Walker placed seventh at the 1990 World Junior Championships, held in November and December 1989 in Colorado Springs, Colorado, and won gold at the 1989 Prague Skate. She placed 6th at the 1991 Skate America and 8th at the 1992 Grand Prix International de Paris.

In NBC's 1994 made-for-TV movie Tonya and Nancy: The Inside Story, Walker served as the skating double for Alexandra Powers, who played Tonya Harding. As of 2016, she works as a skating coach at Iceoplex in Simi Valley, California.

Competitive highlights

References 

1970s births
American female single skaters
Living people
People from Thousand Oaks, California
Sportspeople from Ventura County, California
21st-century American women